Puente de amor, is a 1969 Mexican telenovela produced by Telesistema Mexicano.

Cast 
Angélica María
Ernesto Alonso
Beatriz Baz
Chela Castro
Yolanda Ciani

References

External links 

Mexican telenovelas
Televisa telenovelas
Spanish-language telenovelas
1969 telenovelas
1969 Mexican television series debuts
1969 Mexican television series endings